Yang Zishan (born 6 November 1986) is a Chinese actress. She is known for her breakout role in the film So Young, which won her the Huabiao Award for Outstanding New Actress and the Best Actress awards at the 5th China Image Film Festival and the 5th International Chinese Film Festival. Her outstanding performance in So Young also earned her nominations for best actress for the Golden Rooster Award, the Hundred Flowers Award, and at the Asia-Pacific Film Festival. In 2015, she won the Best Actress Award at the Shanghai International Film Festival for her performance in 20 Once Again. In 2017, She starred in Walking Past the Future, the only Chinese film to be nominated for the Un Certain Regard at the 2017 Cannes Film Festival, and the science fiction thriller Battle of Memories. In 2018, she starred in Till the End of the World, the first film in history to shoot in Antarctica. In 2020, her film Wuhai premiered at the 68th San Sebastian Film Festival where it competed for the Golden Shell. In 2021, her film Ripples of Life premiered at the 2021 Cannes Film Festival.

Filmography

Film

Television series

Discography

Personal life
Yang married actor Matt Wu in 2015. They met while starring in 7-minute romantic drama in Taiwan as part of the 2011 web series Female Zodiac Stories.

Awards and nominations

References

External links

Actresses from Jiangsu
Actresses from Nanjing
21st-century Chinese actresses
Living people
1986 births
Chinese film actresses
Chinese television actresses